Sir John Frederick Price  (3 October 1839 – 12 June 1927) was an Indian civil servant and translator who served as a member of the Madras Legislative Council.

Early life 

Price was born to John Price on 3 October 1839. He had his education at Melbourne University and qualified for the Indian civil service.

Career 

Price joined the Indian civil service in 1862 and served till 1897. He also served as Chief Secretary of the Government of Madras. He was made a Companion of the Order of the Star of India in the 1893 New Year Honours, and upgraded to a Knight Commander of the Order of the Star of India in the 1898 New Year Honours.

Works

References 

1839 births
Knights Commander of the Order of the Star of India
Members of the Madras Legislative Council
1927 deaths